Virginia State Teachers College may refer to:
James Madison University, formerly Virginia State Teachers College (Harrisonburg)
Longwood University, formerly Virginia State Teachers College (Farmville)
Radford University, formerly Virginia State Teachers College (Radford)
University of Mary Washington, formerly Virginia State Teachers College (Fredericksburg)